The first version of this article has been based in the text of :el:Α.Ο. Αγίου Δημητρίου of the Greek Wikipedia published under GFDL.

Agios Dimitrios A.C. (Greek:  Α.Ο. Αγίου Δημητρίου A.Ο. Agiou Dimitriou) is an athletic club in Patras in the upper city neighbourhood in the Achaia prefecture.  Its jersey colours are red and white and it plays in the Achaia Football Clubs Association.  It has the number EPO 1865.  The team had played for many years in the third division.  The team also has a basketball team.

Participation
 Second division: 1980

Achievements

 Achaia Championship: 1
1979
 Second division championship: 2
1978, 1995

References

 Patras Press Museum
 Newspapers: Peloponnisos, I Imera, I Gnomi, Patra Spor
 Lefkoma 100 Chronia Patraiko Podosfairo (100 Years of Football (Soccer) in Patras), City of Patras, 2006
 Book: Fostiras 35 Chronia poreias (Fostiras: 35 Years) Vasilios Kyriazis 2005
 https://web.archive.org/web/20070320150933/http://www.axaioi3.gr/

Sport in Patras
Football clubs in Western Greece
Association football clubs established in 1972
1972 establishments in Greece